Dongyang University is a private university located in Yeongju, South Korea. The graduating class of 2012 numbered 672. The current president is Sung-Hae Choi (최성해).

Academics
A variety of doctoral and master's programs are also provided, mostly in engineering-related fields.
It has been designated as a capacity-building university in the basic competency diagnosis of universities

Location
The main campus is situated in Punggi-eup, an outlying region of Yeongju City.

There is a second campus located in Dongducheon.

Dongducheon is a collection of art departments.

It is a private university located in Korea

History
2010 Seoul Metropolitan Rapid Transit Corporation-Dongyang University Industrial-Academic Convention
2011 01/17 Industrial-Academic Convention for Specialized Education and Training Institutions for Rail Vehicle Drivers
Application for designation of specialized training institutions for railway vehicle driving on Dec. 10 (Ministry of Railway Safety Technology at the Ministry of Land, Infrastructure and Transport)
2012 03/26 Approved for designation as a specialized training institution for the driver's license of a railway vehicle
first-time educator
04/13 Tong Yang University Railway Academy Opening
05/04 Completion of 1st phase of trainees
06/25 2nd class teacher
Completion of 2nd phase trainee for 08/31
09/03 3rd phase of education
Completion of the 3rd phase of November 16
12/17 4th Training School
Completed 4th phase of 2013 02/28
03/11 5th Training School
Completion of 5th phase of 06/05
06/17 6th Training School
Completion of 6th phase of 08/30
09/09 7th Training School
Completion of 7th phase of education on 12/16
Admission to the 8th School of Education on December 23
Completed the 8th phase of 2014 02/28
04/14 9th Training School
Completion of 9th phase of 06/20
06/23 10th Training School
08/29 Completion of 10th Training Students
09/01 The 11th Training School
Completion of the 11th phase of the 11th phase 21
12th Annual Education Students Admission on December 23
Completed 12th phase of 2015 02/28
03/09 13th Training School
Completed 13th term of education at 05/29
06/18 14th Training School
Completion of the 14th phase of the 08/28 Education Students
09/07th 15th Training School
Completion of 15th Class of Education on November 27
12/21 Sixteenth Students of Education
Completed the 16th phase of training in 2016 02/27
03/14 Seventeen-year Trainees Admission (General Inhabitant)
06/10 Completion of 17th Student (General Person)
Admission to the 18th class of 06/30
Completion of the 18th class of 09/02
Entrance to the 19th School of Education at 09/19
12/02 19th term student completion
12/26 Education Students Attached to the 20th School
2017 Completion of 20th Training Students
03/13 21st generation of trainees (general class)
04/01 Changing the Name of the Railway Technology Education Center at Tong Yang University (Driver Licensing Department)
Open a public relations class at Tong Yang University's Railway Academy
06/09 21st generation of trainees completed (general population)
06/26 22nd Training School
Completed the 22nd phase of the 08/26 training program.
Admission to the public enterprise class for the 17th semester of August 28 and 28 semester
09/11 23rd Training School
Completion of the 23rd phase of education in December/01
12/19 24th Annual Training School
Completed 24th Training Students for the 2018 03/02
03/05 18-1st semester, enter the public enterprise class
03/12 25th class (general class)
06/08 Completion of 25th Training Students (General Person)
07/02 26th Training School
Entering the public enterprise class in the 18-2 semester of the 08/27
09/01 26th student completed
Admission to the 27th phase of the 09/10 Education Students
Rename Tong Yang University Railway Academy (Driver Licensing Training Team)
27th Annual Training Completion
Admission to the 28th School of Education on December 17
2019 01/14 29th theoretical class educator (general college)
Completion of 28th Class of Trainee 02/28
29th Annual Seminary Trainee Completion (General Person)
03/04 19-1 Semester Class of Public Enterprises
03/25 Education students in the 29th functional class (general college)
04/29 Admission to the 30th School of Education
Completion of the 29th functional class for 06/14 (general person)
Entering the 31st class of 07/15
09/06 Completion of 30th Student
Admission to the 32nd School

See also
List of colleges and universities in South Korea
Education in South Korea
Undergraduate
Tong Yang University has 10 colleges, and the department of theater and film chemistry is the only department not affiliated with the college.

Main school campus
University of Public Administration, University of Social Sciences, University of Aeronautics, University of Railways, College of Health and Criminology
Department of Police Administration
Department of Building Fire Safety
Department of Social Welfare
Department of Urban Culture Content
Department of Global Business
Department of Business Administration
Department of Conservation of Cultural Properties
Department of Fashion Management
Department of Aeronautical Services
Department of Aeronautics and IT
Department of Rail Management
Department of Rail Operation Control
Department of Railway Mechanical Systems
Department of Railway Construction Safety Engineering
Department of Railway Electrical Convergence
Early Childhood Education
Department of Nursing Science
Department of Health and Medical Administration
Department of Living and Physical Education
Department of Drama and Sciences, Department of Applied Life Sciences, Department of Drama and Sciences, Department of Defense Science and Technology University, Energy and Engineering College.
Department of Military Affairs in Computer and Information Communication
Department of Computer Science
Department of Electronic Engineering
Hwagong Biotech Co., Ltd.
Department of Architectural Interior
Department of Jewelry and Jewelry
Dongducheon Campus
University of Public Humanities College of Art
Department of Public Humanities
a major in public administration
major in public management
a public relations major
Department of Techno-Communist Artificial Intelligence
Public Safety Engineering major
A fusion it
Techno relevant major public office
Safety Engineering
In industrial safety
Major public safety
Techno relevant major public office
The department of game
In games,
In game art
Design
In Visual Communication Design
Public design major
Living design major
The performance of VISUAL
In smoke.
Major production directed by
In video
Graduate school
General graduate school
Graduate school of education
Graduate School of Information

facility
Yeongju Campus
School facility and auxiliary organizations
School facility and auxiliary organizations
Hyunam Kwan (University Headquarters)
Shin Jae Gwan
Jang Yeong-silgwan
Jang In Gwan
Dasan Pavilion (Humanities and Social Sciences Museum)
Library
Welfare-dong
Hyunamjeongsa (Humanity Training Center)
a school gang
Gym
DYU Tower (Startup Nursing Center)
Student Counseling Center
Barracks
Ilshinjae (A)
Saimdang (B)
Sambonggwan (C)
Hoeeonjae (power room) (d, e)
Gounjae (Civil Service Academy) (h)
Dongducheon Campus
School facility and auxiliary organizations
College
Silseupttong a
Silseupttong b
Library
student restaurant
Barracks
Dorm Building No1
Dormitory, 2-dong
Dorm, Korea
A dormitory, Korea
a recreation ground
Observatory
Concourse

traffic

Campus of this school
Punggi Station

Dongducheon Campus
Walk 10 minutes from Exit 1 of Dongducheon Station

External links
 

Universities and colleges in North Gyeongsang Province